Rarowatu is a kecamatan or district in Bombana Regency, Southeast Sulawesi, Indonesia. Localities in Rarowatu include Eeea.

See also 

 List of districts of Southeast Sulawesi

Districts of Southeast Sulawesi